A hairpin is a device used to hold a person's hair in place.

Hairpin or Hairpins may also refer to:
Hairpin turn, a tight turn on a road
Hairpin cotter, a formed wire fastener most commonly used in clevis pins
Hairpin clip, a formed wire fastener designed for use in grooved shafts
A hairpin loop, a pattern in DNA or RNA in biochemistry
β-Hairpin, a secondary structure motif of proteins
Hairpins (film), a 1920 film directed by Fred Niblo
Hairpin, in music, the nickname for crescendo and decrescendo markings. See Dynamics (music)#Gradual changes
The Devil's Hairpin, a 1957 American feature film about car racing
Hairpin Arts Center, a community art center in Chicago
Hairpin Banksia, woody shrub.
Hairpin Beach, a gazetted beach in Stanley, Hong Kong
Hairpin RNA, an artificial RNA molecule
Hairpin lace, a lace-making technique
Hairpin ribozyme, a small section of RNA that can act as a ribozyme
Ramsey Hairpin, a hairpin bend on the course of the Isle of Man TT Races
The Hairpin, a women's website
The Human Hairpin, a nickname for the American boxer, Harry Harris
Hairpin network address translation

ja:ヘアピン